Légende Entreprises is a French film production company founded by Alain Goldman in 1992. Its first film was Ridley Scott's  1492: Conquest of Paradise in 1992, which was followed by Martin Scorsese's Casino in 1995. After gaining the most capital-intensive, producing a small part of the two previous blockbusters, Légende was dedicated to niche films like The Pact of Silence and Roland Joffé's Vatel in 2000. Also it produced the short film Suzy Vend des Sushis.

Filmography

References 

Film production companies of France
Mass media companies established in 1992